The Perkin reaction is an organic reaction developed by English chemist William Henry Perkin that is used to make cinnamic acids. It gives an α,β-unsaturated aromatic acid or  α-substituted β-aryl acrylic acid by the aldol condensation of an aromatic aldehyde and an acid anhydride, in the presence of an alkali salt of the acid. The alkali salt acts as a base catalyst, and other bases can be used instead.

Several reviews have been written.

Reaction  mechanism

Clear from the reaction mechanism, the anhydride of aliphatic acid must contain at least 2 α-H for the reaction to occur. The above mechanism is not universally accepted, as several other versions exist, including decarboxylation without acetic group transfer.

Applications
Benzaldehyde reacts with acetic anhydride in the presence of sodium or potassium acetate to form cinnamic acid.
One notable application for the Perkin reaction is in the laboratory synthesis of the phytoestrogenic stilbene resveratrol (c.f. fo-ti).

See also
Erlenmeyer–Plöchl azlactone and amino-acid synthesis
Stobbe condensation
Pechmann condensation

References

Condensation reactions
Name reactions